Cressida Bell (born 1959) is an English artist and designer, specializing in textiles, interior design, cake decoration and illustration.

She is the daughter of critic, author and artist Quentin Bell and Anne Olivier Bell. She is the granddaughter of Vanessa Bell and great niece of Virginia Woolf.

She studied at Middlesex Polytechnic, Saint Martin's School of Art and finally at the Royal College of Art in London, where she graduated in 1984 with an MA in textile design.

In July 1986 thieves broke into her studio and stole £3,000 of hand-made limited edition scarves. She appeared on Crimewatch in September 1986 to appeal for information on the crime

Her work shows some influence from her family background of the Bloomsbury Group but she has developed her own very individual style which is more meticulous and less painterly.

Bell also decorates cakes to commission, having published a book Cressida Bell’s Cake Design in 2013.

Publications
 Cressida Bell - The Decorative Painter (1996)
 Cressida Bell - Cressida Bell’s Cake Design: Fifty Fabulous Cakes (2013)

See also
List of Bloomsbury Group people

References

External links
 Cressida Bell studio website
 Charleston Farmhouse website

1959 births
Living people
Alumni of the Royal College of Art
Alumni of Saint Martin's School of Art
English designers
Stephen-Bell family
British textile designers